Adelina Tattilo (13 November 1928 – 1 February 2007) was an Italian publisher. She is acknowledged to be a pioneer in the Italian erotic magazine publishing sector, who contributed to change the social customs Italy from the second half the 1960s. By launching Playmen, Tattilo engaged publishers (like Americans Hugh Hefner and Larry Flynt did) in an ideological battle to liberate sexual attitudes and free them from bigotry and false moralisms.

Early life, family and education

Adelina Tattilo was born in Manfredonia, Apulia. She was educated at schools managed by nuns in Ivrea, Turin.

Career
In the 1960s, Tattilo launched Menelik, a weekly magazine of erotic comic strips, featuring the character Bernarda. This periodical came to sell up to 100,000 copies each week. 

In 1965 Tattilio and her husband Saro Balsamo broke into publishing with a weekly magazine, Big, for teenage boys which answered questions of curiosity about sex. Big reached sales approaching 400,000 per week. A year later they started Men, a weekly collection of photographs of nude women purchased from Scandinavia or provided by Italian modeling agents. Playmen was founded in 1967, and looked similar to the American periodical Playboy, which was then banned in Italy. Tattilio reported that Playmen cost US$640,000 to launch, in 1967, and it had risen to an estimated net worth of US$1,600,000 in as soon as 1971.

Tattilo made the decisions at Playmen, including cover girl choices and took risks such as publishing covert paparazzi pictures of Brigitte Bardot sunbathing topless, and of Jackie Kennedy Onassis swimming nude.

In the 1960s and 1970s, Adelina Tattilo fought for a libertarian, radical and socialist view in Italy and cultivated a friendship with Bettino Craxi.

In the early 1970s, Tattilo's publishing house introduced  on the market with a series of books including Dizionario della Letteratura Erotica (Dictionary of Erotic Literature),  La Marijuana Fa Bene (Marijuana Does You Good), and Playdux (1973), an erotic history of fascism.

Personal life

Tattilo married Saro Balsamo. They worked together. Later, however, then separated. Tattilo had three children.

She died in Rome, February 1, 2007, after a brief illness at the age of 78.

References

External links
Adelina Tattilo Obituary, repubblica.it

1929 births
2007 deaths
Italian magazine editors
Italian women editors
Italian magazine founders
Adult magazine publishers (people)
Italian pornographers
Women magazine editors
20th-century Italian women writers